No Kinda Dancer is the first album by Texas-based Folk singer-songwriter Robert Earl Keen, originally released in the United States on the Austin, TX based Workshop Records label in 1984. A few months later, the album was issued by Philo Records and re-released in 2004 by KOCH Records with additional tracks. Notable for "The Front Porch Song" co-written by Lyle Lovett. The horn section arrangement for the title track was done by Austin-based tubist Dan Augustine, who also played on the original recorded version.

Track listing
All tracks written by Robert Earl Keen, except where noted.

"No Kinda Dancer" – 3:04
"The Front Porch Song" (Robert Earl Keen, Lyle Lovett) – 3:38
"Between Hello & Goodbye" – 2:33
"Swervin' In My Lane" (descant written by Nanci Griffith) – 4:03
"Christabel" – 4:03
"Willie" – 2:34
"Young Lovers Waltz" – 3:38
"Death Of Tail Fitzsimmons" (instrumental) – 4:00
"Rolling By" – 3:47
"The Armadillo Jackal" – 3:25
"Song For Kathy" (previously unreleased) – 3:02
"Luann" – 2:58 †
"The Coldest Day Of Winter" – 3:23 †
"The Vacuum Cleaner Song" – 2:31 †

† Bonus Tracks on 2004 Re-Release

1984 debut albums
Robert Earl Keen albums
Sugar Hill Records albums